Hor-Aha (or Aha or Horus Aha) is considered  the second pharaoh of the First Dynasty of Egypt by some Egyptologists, while others consider him the first one and corresponding to Menes. He lived around the 31st century BC and is thought to have had a long reign.

Identity

Name
The commonly used name Hor-Aha is a rendering of the pharaoh's Horus-name, an element of the royal titulary associated with the god Horus, and is more fully given as Horus-Aha meaning Horus the Fighter.

Manetho's record Aegyptiaca (translating to History of Egypt) lists his Greek name as Athothis, or "Athotís".

For the Early Dynastic Period, the archaeological record refers to the pharaohs by their Horus-names, while the historical record, as evidenced in the Turin and Abydos king lists, uses an alternative royal titulary, the nebty-name. The different titular elements of a pharaoh's name were often used in isolation, for brevity's sake, although the choice varied according to circumstance and period.

Mainstream Egyptological consensus follows the findings of Flinders Petrie in reconciling the two records and connects Hor-Aha (archaeological) with the nebty-name Ity (historical).

The same process has led to the identification of the historical Menes (a nebty-name) with Narmer (a Horus-name) evidenced in the archaeological record (both figures are credited with the unification of Egypt and as the first pharaoh of Dynasty I) as the predecessor of Hor-Aha (the second pharaoh).

Theories 
There has been some controversy about Hor-Aha. Some believe him to be the same individual as the legendary Menes and that he was the one to unify all of Egypt. Others claim he was the son of Narmer, the pharaoh who unified Egypt. Narmer and Menes may have been one pharaoh, referred to with more than one name. Regardless, considerable historical evidence from the period points to Narmer as the pharaoh who first unified Egypt (see Narmer Palette) and to Hor-Aha as his son and heir.

Reign

Successor to Narmer
Seal impressions discovered by Günter Dreyer in the Umm El Qa'ab from Den and Qa'a burials identify Hor-Aha as the second pharaoh of the first dynasty. His predecessor Narmer had united Upper Egypt and Lower Egypt into a single kingdom, Upper and Lower Egypt. Hor-Aha probably ascended the throne in the mid 31st century BC.

Interior policy
Hor-Aha seems to have conducted many religious activities. A visit to a shrine of the goddess Neith is recorded on several tablets from his reign. The sanctuary of Neith he visited was located in the north-west of the Nile Delta at Sais. Furthermore, the first known representation of the sacred Henu-barque of the god Seker- was found engraved on a year tablet dating from his reign.

Vessel inscriptions, labels and sealings from the graves of Hor-Aha and Queen Neithhotep suggest that this queen died during the reign of Aha. He arranged for her burial in a magnificent mastaba excavated by Jacques de Morgan. Queen Neithhotep is plausibly Aha's mother The selection of the cemetery of Naqada as the resting place of Neithhotep is a strong indication that she came from this province. This, in turn, supports the view that Narmer married a member of the ancient royal line of Naqada to strengthen the domination of the Thinite kings over the region. However, in January 2016, a rock inscription has demonstrated that Neithhotep was actually a queen regent early during the reign of Djer, Hor-Aha's successor. Therefore, the cemetery evidence above only proves that Neithhotep did live during the reign of Hor-Aha but succeeded him into Djer's reign.

Most importantly, the oldest mastaba at the North Saqqara necropolis of Memphis dates to his reign. The mastaba belongs to an elite member of the administration who may have been a relative of Hor-Aha, as was customary at the time. This is a strong indication of the growing importance of Memphis during Aha's reign.

Economic development
Few artifacts remain of Hor-Aha's reign. However, the finely executed copper-axe heads, faience vessel fragments, ivory box and inscribed white marbles all testify to the flourishing of craftsmanship during Aha's time in power.

Activities outside Egypt
Inscription on an ivory tablet from Abydos suggests that Hor-Aha led an expedition against the Nubians. On a year tablet, a year is explicitly called 'Year of smiting of Ta-Sety' (i.e. Nubia).

During Hor-Aha's reign, trade with the Southern Levant seems to have been on the decline. Contrary to his predecessor Narmer, Hor-Aha is not attested outside of the Nile Valley. This may point to a gradual replacement of long-distance trade between Egypt and its eastern neighbors by a more direct exploitation of the local resources by the Egyptians. Vessel fragment analysis from an Egyptian outpost at En Besor suggests that it was active during Hor-Aha's reign. Other Egyptian settlements are known to have been active at the time as well (Byblos and along the Lebanese coast). Finally, Hor-Aha's tomb yielded vessel fragments from the Southern Levant.

Manetho
According to the Egyptian priest Manetho (who lived over 2,600 years after Hor-Aha's reign), Aha built a palace in Memphis and was a skilled physician who wrote multiple books on anatomy.

Family 

Hor-Aha's chief wife was Benerib, whose name was "written alongside his on a number of [historical] pieces, in particular, from tomb B14 at Abydos, Egypt". Tomb B14 is located directly adjacent to Hor-Aha's sepulchre. Hor-Aha also had another wife, Khenthap, with whom he became father of Djer. She is mentioned as Djer's mother on the Cairo Annals Stone.

Hor-Aha's mother is believed to be Neithhotep. She is also believed to be wife of the late Narmer and possibly remarries one of Hor-Aha's top three Grand Viziers by the name of Rekhit after the death of Narmer. The massive Naqada tomb Neithhotep was believed to be buried has 10 inscriptions of her in it. The same tomb also has 15 inscriptions to Rekhit.

Tomb

The tomb of Hor-Aha is located in the necropolis of the kings of the 1st Dynasty at Abydos, known as the Umm el-Qa'ab. It comprises three large chambers (designated B10, B15, and B19), which are directly adjacent to Narmer's tomb. The chambers are rectangular, directly dug in the desert floor, their walls lined with mud bricks.
The tombs of Narmer and Ka had only two adjacent chambers, while the tomb of Hor-Aha comprises three substantially larger yet separated chambers. The reason for this architecture is that it was difficult at that time to build large ceilings above the chambers, as timber for these structures often had to be imported from Canaan.

A striking innovation of Hor-Aha's tomb is that members of the royal household were buried with the pharaoh, the earliest known retainer sacrifices in Egypt. It is unclear if they were killed or committed suicide. Among those buried were servants, dwarfs, women and even dogs. A total of 36 subsidiary burials were laid out in three parallel rows north-east of Hor-Aha's main chambers. As a symbol of royalty Hor-Aha was even given a group of young lions.

Gallery

In popular culture
 Episode 1 of season 4 of Franklin & Bash, "The Curse of Hor-Aha"  revolves around  a rare Egyptian artifact and the protagonists trying to find it to get their boss back.
 Murder by the Gods: An Ancient Egyptian Mystery by William G. Collins is a thriller about Prince Aha (later king Hor-Aha), with Narmer included in a secondary role.

See also
 Ancient Egypt
 Ancient Egyptian retainer sacrifices
 History of Egypt
 List of Pharaohs
 Pharaoh
 The Greatest Pharaohs

Citations

General bibliography 
 .
 .
 
 
 
 Toby A. H. Wilkinson, Early Dynastic Egypt, Routledge, London/New York 1999, 70-71

External links 
 Corpus of Wooden and Ivory Labels - Aha by Francesco Raffaele

 
31st-century BC Pharaohs
Pharaohs of the First Dynasty of Egypt